Hameringham is an extended village in the East Lindsey district of Lincolnshire, England. It is in the civil parish of Lusby with Winceby.

The parish church is dedicated to All Saints, and is a Grade II listed building dating from the year 1200, although heavily restored in 1893 by Hodgson Fowler after the nave collapsed. It is made from greenstone, brick, limestone and red sandstone.

Hameringham belongs to the Fen and Hill Group of Parishes which also includes: 
Mareham le Fen, St Helen
Mareham on the Hill, All Saints
Revesby, St Lawrence
Scrivelsby, St Benedict
Wilksby, All Saints

The Thatched Cottage is a Grade II listed late 18th-century mud and stud thatched cottage.

Dunsthorpe is a deserted medieval village which was located near the present Hameringham Grange. The church was in ruins by 1421 and in 1437-08 the parishes were united to become Hameringham. Bones have been found here.

References

External links

Villages in Lincolnshire
Civil parishes in Lincolnshire
East Lindsey District